The Traffic Control Police (Vietnamese: Cảnh Sát Kiểm Soát Giao Thông – CSKSGT) or simply ‘Circulation’ in French and nicknamed the "white mice" due to their all-white service uniforms, was the traffic regulation branch of the Republic of Vietnam National Police (Vietnamese: Cảnh Sát Quốc Gia – CSQG).  During the Vietnam War, the Traffic Control Police operated closely with the ARVN Military Police Corps from 1962 to 1975.

Uniforms and insignia
Traffic Control Police agents were given an all-white cotton service uniform consisting of a long-sleeved shirt and trousers, worn with a matching white peaked cap; the shirt had dark blue removable shoulder boards and badges and other insignia were in silvered metal.

See also
 ARVN Military Police
 First Indochina War
 Phoenix Program
 Republic of Vietnam
 Republic of Vietnam Military Forces
 Vietnam War
 Weapons of the Vietnam War

Notes

References
 Sir Robert Thompson et al., Report on the Republic of Vietnam National Police, 1971. [available online at http://www.counterinsurgency.org/1971%20Thompson%20Police/Thompson%20Police.htm]
 Valéry Tarrius, La Police de Campagne du Sud-Vietnam 1967-1975, in Armes Militaria Magazine, March 2005 issue, Histoire & Collections, Paris, pp. 37–43.  (in French)

External links
Federation of South Vietnam Police Associations (in Vietnamese)
The "White Mice" of Vietnam 
RVN National Police at globalsecurity.org
 http://camopedia.org/index.php?title=Republic_of_Vietnam
 http://www.polinsignia.com/vietnam.htm

Republic of Vietnam National Police
1975 disestablishments